The men's javelin F35/36 event at the 2008 Summer Paralympics took place at the Beijing National Stadium at 18:18 on 8 September. There was a single round of competition, and as there were only 6 contestants they all had 6 throws.
The competition was won by Guo Wei, representing .

Results

 
WR = World Record. SB = Seasonal Best.

References

Athletics at the 2008 Summer Paralympics